Fencing competitions at the 2019 Southeast Asian Games in Philippines were held at the World Trade Center Metro Manila from 3 to 8 December 2019.

Medal table

Medalists

Men

Women

References

External links
 

2019
Southeast Asian Games
2019 Southeast Asian Games events